James Stanislaus Bell (9 January 1797 – 10 March 1858) was a British adventurer and writer who participated in the Russo-Circassian War on the side of the Circassians.

Bell was involved in a case against Russia known as the Mission of the Vixen. He was the owner of a ship that was detained by the Russian coast guard, so he remained in Circassia from 1838 to 1839. Under the guise of establishing commercial relations, he was aiding the resistance of the Circassians against the Russian Empire. He compiled a description of the local peoples and a map of Circassia. He published his memoirs in 1840.

Family 
 eldest daughter: Emilia
 son: Charles Napier Bell (1835–1906)

References

Further reading 
 Journal of a Residence in Circassia (1840) Vol. 1 and Vol. 2 – via Internet Archive
 1837, 1838 ve 1839 yıllarında Çerkesya'da kalış günlüğü // Doğu Edebiyatı.

1858 deaths
People of the Caucasian War
British memoirists
1797 births
Circassian military personnel of the Russo-Circassian War